Princess Maria Ferdinanda of Saxony (27 April 1796 – 3 January 1865) was a daughter of Maximilian, Crown Prince of Saxony and his first wife Princess Carolina of Parma. She was by marriage Grand Duchess of Tuscany from 1821 to 1824.

Early life and family
Maria Ferdinanda was born to Maximilian, Crown Prince of Saxony and his first wife Princess Caroline of Parma on 27 April 1796. She was their second eldest daughter. As her mother died in 1804, her father remarried in 1825 to Princess Maria Luisa Carlota of Parma, but this marriage would produce no new siblings. Her father died in 1838, having renounced his rights to the succession of Saxony in favor of his eldest son.

Maria Ferdinanda had seven siblings, most of whom married well. Her older sister was Princess Amalie, a notable composer. Her next younger brother would become Frederick Augustus II of Saxony in 1836. Her next brother was Prince Klemens, who would die at the age of 24. Her next three siblings (Maria Anna, John, and Maria Josepha Amalia) would become by birth or marriage Grand Duchess of Tuscany, King of Saxony, and Queen of Spain respectively.

In 1817, Maria Ferdinanda accompanied her younger sister Princess Maria Anna of Saxony to Florence, where she was going to marry the future Leopold II, Grand Duke of Tuscany. The two were very close, so that Maria Anna was too scared to go without Maria Ferdinanda's company. The couple duly married. Something decidedly unexpected occurred however. Maria Ferdinanda caught the eye of Leopold's elderly father Ferdinand III, Grand Duke of Tuscany.

Marriage

On 6 May 1821, Maria Ferdinanda was married to Ferdinand III, Grand Duke of Tuscany in Florence. She was his second wife, and he was twenty-seven years older. She was his first cousin once removed as well as a first cousin once removed of his first wife Princess Luisa of Naples. Ferdinand may have desired this second marriage because the succession was in doubt: though his only son had recently married Maria Ferdinanda’s sister Maria Anna, he was considered sickly. No children were born of this marriage.

As Maria Ferdinanda's younger sister Princess Maria Anna of Saxony was married to Ferdinand's son Leopold, Maria Ferdinanda thus became her own sister's step-mother-in-law.

Ferdinand died in 1824 in Florence, causing his son Leopold, and Leopold's wife Maria Anna, to succeed as Grand Duke and Grand Duchess of Tuscany.

Later life
In 1859, the Tuscan royal family lost their claims to the throne during the Italian Unification. The royal family left the Palazzo Pitti in Florence for the Austrian court of Emperor Francis Joseph and Empress Elisabeth in Vienna. Maria Ferdinanda lived mainly from then on in Schlackenwerth, but was often a guest of her brother King John of Saxony in Dresden. She had an especially close relationship with her sister Amalie. Maria Ferdinanda was a bearer of the royal Order of the Noble Ladies of Maria Luisa, an order founded by Queen Maria Louisa of Spain.

Maria Ferdinanda remained a widow for forty-one years, finally dying on 3 January 1865. She was buried in the Imperial Crypt, Vienna.

Ancestry

References

Sources

 This article is partly based on its counterpart in the German Wikipedia as it stood on 3 February 2010.

|-

1796 births
1865 deaths
Nobility from Dresden
Saxon princesses
House of Wettin
Grand Duchesses of Tuscany
Albertine branch
Burials at the Imperial Crypt